"Let Them Call It Jazz" is a short story by Jean Rhys. The story was first published in The London Magazine in February 1962.

Plot 
The plot of the story follows the life of the narrator (Selina Davis), a biracial Afro-Caribbean woman in mid-20th-century England. The narrator is living in London and trying to find work as a seamstress, but her cultural views conflict with those of her British acquaintances. At the beginning of the story she is evicted from her apartment over a rent dispute, and soon meets a man in a café who offers her lodging in his house. The house - described as "classy" by the narrator - is older than other homes on the street, and the owner's refusal to change the home has created friction with the neighbors.

The narrator lives in the home for a week but is unable to find work, instead passing her time thinking, drinking and singing. She is scrutinized by her neighbors, who disparage the narrator's lack of work, drinking habits, and singing; one couple is also overtly racist and sexist towards her. The narrator copes with this by drinking and taking sleeping pills. In one conversation with the house's owner, the man reveals that he values the house but may sell the lease, lamenting what money does to people. When the narrator responds that money has never meant much to her, the man retorts that she is a fool, then, and states that those without money will be pushed around and inevitably be made caricatures of themselves. 

The next week, the narrator gets into two confrontations with the neighboring couple. The first encounter results in her being fined £5 for singing in the street, while during the second she (in a fit of frustration) throws a rock through the couple's window and is arrested. The narrator is unable to pay her fine or explain her case to the local magistrate, and so is incarcerated for 10 days in Holloway Prison. While in prison she hears a song (the "Holloway Song") being sung by the other prisoners. The narrator enjoys the tune and adds her own inflections to, imagining it being played on trumpets so "these walls will fall and rest". Inspired by the song and the resilience of the other prisoners, the narrator regains some lost weight and stops drinking. She is released after 10 days after an unknown benefactor pays her fine, but upon her return to her house she finds the home being remodeled.

Some time after, the narrator gets a job in an upscale clothier, lying about her credentials in the process. During a party at her co-worker's house she - having given up singing - whistles the Holloway song, which attracts the attention of a man at the party. The man plays a jazzed-up version of her song on a borrowed piano; the narrator dislikes this, stating it is being played wrong and feeling that her source of resiliency has been warped. However, the other guests like the new song. Later, the narrator receives a thank-you note and £5 from the man, who writes that he has sold the song and that she was "quite a help" inspiring him. She is initially horrified, grieving that the song - a symbol of her struggle - was the only thing she had. However, she eventually concludes that the song was sung for her, and that, no matter how the song is played now, it will make no difference to the song she heard. With this in mind, she muses that people can play it how they like and 'let them call it jazz', and buys a dress with the money.

Description 
"Let Them Call It Jazz" is one of the short stories Jean Rhys' wrote at Cheriton Fitzpaine during her absence from the literary spotlight. The story was first published in The London Magazine in 1962, and later appeared with other of Rhys' short stories in her 1968 compilation Tigers Are Better-Looking. Many sources describe the story as a work of postcolonial literature.

Originally published in print, the short story was adapted into a radio-play by Winsome Pinnock for BBC Radio 4 in 1998. Jamaican writer Honor Ford-Smith also created a dramatic adaptation of Rhys' story.

Themes 
The story's themes include cultural exchange, cultural identity, the Caribbean diaspora, sexism, racism, and colonialism.

References 

1962 short stories
Works originally published in The London Magazine